David Shelton may refer to:

David Shelton (sailor), see List of World Championships medalists in sailing (centreboard classes)
David Shelton, namesake of Shelton, Washington
David Shelton (Canadian football), see 81st Grey Cup
Dave Shelton, soccer player

See also
David Shelton House, on National Register of Historic Places listings in Talbot County, Georgia
David Sheldon (disambiguation)